Andrews High School (AHS) in Andrews, North Carolina serves grades 9–12 and is one of only three high schools in the Cherokee County Schools System. As of 2007 it had a full-time teaching staff of 27 teachers giving an average of 11 students per teacher. In 2019–20 average daily membership was 203. The current building is a one-story, three building campus, built in 1962, after the original three-story campus was burned down months earlier. By 2025, as a result of a May 2020 vote by the Cherokee County Board of Education, students from the county's three high schools will attend one high school.

Athletics

Sports teams
Football, Volleyball, Track, Soccer, Softball, Baseball, Basketball

Facilities
Gym, weight-room, showers, track

References

External links 
Greatschools.net profile
List of high schools in North Carolina

Public high schools in North Carolina
Schools in Cherokee County, North Carolina